Chahkand or Chah Kand may refer to:
 Chahkand, Baqeran
 Chah Kand, Fasharud
 Chah Kand, alternate name for Chahkandak
 Chahkand, Sarbisheh
 Chahkand-e Gol
 Chahkand-e Mud

See also
 Chahkanduk (disambiguation)